Snow Hill Colored High School, also known as Greene County Colored Training School and Rosenwald Center for Cultural Enrichment, is a historic Rosenwald School building located at Snow Hill, Greene County, North Carolina.  It was built in 1925, and is a one-story, seven bay, "H"-shaped brick building.  A six classroom addition was built about 1935.  Also on the property are the contributing Mary M. Battle Monument (c. 1925) and baseball field (c. 1935, c. 1950).  The Snow Hill Colored High School is one of five schools that were constructed using Rosenwald funds in Greene County, including the Zachariah School.

It was listed on the National Register of Historic Places in 2003.

References

JoAnn Artis Stevens - Rosenwald Center for Cultural Enrichment.

African-American history of North Carolina
High schools in North Carolina
Rosenwald schools in North Carolina
School buildings on the National Register of Historic Places in North Carolina
School buildings completed in 1925
Buildings and structures in Greene County, North Carolina
National Register of Historic Places in Greene County, North Carolina
1925 establishments in North Carolina